The Morokweng impact structure is an impact structure buried beneath the Kalahari Desert near the town of Morokweng in South Africa's North West province, close to the border with Botswana.

Description 
Discovered in 1994, it is not exposed at the surface, but has been mapped by magnetic and gravimetric surveys. Core samples have shown it to have been formed by the impact of an L chondrite asteroid estimated to have been  in diameter.

This discovery was unexpected, since previous drillings on large impact structures had not produced such fragments, and it was thought that the asteroid had been almost entirely vaporised. Some of the fragments can be seen in the Antenna Wing of London's Science Museum.

References

Further reading

External links 
 Fossil Meteorite Unearthed From Crater

Impact craters of South Africa
Cretaceous impact craters
Jurassic impact craters
Late Jurassic Africa
Early Cretaceous Africa
Cretaceous South Africa
Jurassic South Africa